The Los Blázquez Offensive took place during the Spanish Civil War in 1938.

References

Battles of the Spanish Civil War
1938 in Spain
Conflicts in 1938